Saint-Cyr-du-Bailleul is a commune in the Manche department in Normandy in northwestern France.

See also
Communes of the Manche department

References

Saintcyrdubailleul